The M45 SLBM was a French Navy submarine-launched ballistic missile (In French terminology, the MSBS - Mer-Sol-Ballistique-Stratégique (Sea-ground-Strategic ballistic missile).)
Forty-eight M45 were in commission in the Force océanique stratégique, the submarine nuclear deterrent component of the French Navy.
The missiles, derived from the M4, were produced by Aérospatiale (now EADS SPACE Transportation). Initially, an ICBM land-based version was considered, but these plans were discarded in 1996 to favour an all-naval deployment.

The M45 differs from its predecessor by its increased range (6,000 km vs. 4,000 km), its increased accuracy and penetration capabilities and its new TN-75 warheads. Each missile carries six MIRVs, each armed with a thermonuclear warhead of 110 kt. The M45 has a reported accuracy of 350 m CEP using an inertial missile guidance system coupled with computer payload control. It was succeeded by the M51 SLBM.

The Ministry of Defense had planned to replace the M45 model with the M51 model since 2004, but the last M45 was only removed from service in 2016. However, its successor, the M51 model, was formally introduced in 2010 and has since entered service. Throughout its service, only 64 out of the 192 missiles that were built are believed to have been used.

Tests
In March 1986, a M-4 missile was launched and covered 6,000 km to its target; this flight is rumoured to have been the first test flight for the M-45.

On the night of the 1–2 June 2004, the  Vigilant fired a version of the M45 from the southern part of Brittany; the missile hit its target near French Guiana.

Former Operators
 
French Navy - Original primary armament for the Triomphant-class SSBN. As of 2016, replaced by the M51 SLBM.

See also
 M51 (missile)
 R-29 Vysota
 R-29RM Shtil
 R-29RMU Sineva
 R-29RMU2 Layner
 RSM-56 Bulava
 UGM-133 Trident II
 JL-1
 JL-2
 K Missile family
 Pukkuksong-1
 R-39 Rif
 R-39M

Sources and references

Submarine-launched ballistic missiles of France
Nuclear weapons of France
1996 establishments in France
Military equipment introduced in the 1990s